Cimone (Zimón in local dialect) is a comune (municipality) in Trentino in the northern Italian region Trentino-Alto Adige/Südtirol, located about  southwest of Trento.

Cimone borders the following municipalities: Trento, Garniga Terme, Cavedine, Aldeno, Villa Lagarina, and Pomarolo.

Demographic evolution

References

Cities and towns in Trentino-Alto Adige/Südtirol